Francis M. Bridges (July 27, 1834 – March 20, 1885) was an American politician from Illinois. Born to one of the early families of Greene County, Illinois, Bridges was raised there and studied at Shurtleff College. He then worked at a store in Missouri, rising to its partnership. After a brief foray out west, Bridges returned to Greene County to farm. He was elected to the Illinois House of Representatives in 1878, then to the Illinois Senate in 1882.

Biography
Francis "Frank" M. Bridges was born in Greene County, Illinois, on July 27, 1834. His parents, Archibald and Dorleska (Eldred), were among the first settlers of the county, owning a large  tract of land. Bridges was raised there and helped manage the farm until he was twenty-two. He also attended public schools in Carrollton, Illinois, until that age. He then matriculated at Shurtleff College in Alton, Illinois. Upon graduation, Bridges left for Memphis, Missouri, where he worked as a clerk in a dry goods store. He became a partner two or three years later and the firm became known as Bridges & Billups.

In 1862, the partnership dissolved and Bridges sold the remaining goods. He then invested this money in horses and re-sold them in California. He remained in the state for a year, managing a hotel. Bridges moved to Virginia City, Nevada, to run a quartz mill. Two years later, in September 1864, Bridges returned to Memphis, then returned to Greene County to support his mother. After helping her for two years, Bridges purchased an  tract of land nearby and built his own house. He stayed there for five years, until his mother died. Bridges purchased the estate of his siblings and moved onto the large family farm, where he stayed for the rest of his life.

Bridges became involved in local politics and was elected Green County sheriff on November 21, 1874. After a four-year term, he was elected as a Democrat to the Illinois House of Representatives, where he served a two-year term. Bridges was elected to the Illinois Senate in 1882, but died before his four-year term was complete.

Bridges married Lena Hudnall on October 11, 1860. They had six children, three surviving to adulthood: Helen, Archibald, and Jessie. Bridges died on March 20, 1885, after a bout of paralysis. At the time of his death, he owned  in Greene County. He was buried in Carrollton City Cemetery.

References

1834 births
1885 deaths
Democratic Party Illinois state senators
Democratic Party members of the Illinois House of Representatives
People from Greene County, Illinois
People from Memphis, Missouri
People from Virginia City, Nevada
Shurtleff College alumni
Farmers from Illinois
19th-century American politicians